Matthew "Matt" Daylight (born 2 March 1974) is a former Scotland rugby league footballer who played on the . A speedy outside back, he played for five different clubs throughout his career in both Australia and England.

Career

Australia
Daylight started his career with the Cronulla-Sutherland Sharks in 1995, playing two games for the Sharks. In 1997 he joined the Western Reds who would play in the Australian Super League competition. His most successful stint in Australia was in the inaugural season of the National Rugby League when he played for the Adelaide Rams. Daylight played 20 games for the Rams, scoring 7 tries.

Daylight's last season was again with Cronulla in 2001, where he played just three games and scored one try.

England
After the Rams were dissolved prior to the 1999 NRL season, Daylight linked with the Gateshead Thunder in 1999, scoring 25 tries in 30 appearances for the club. He then left the Thunder to join Hull F.C. in 2000, scoring 12 tries in 22 games.

Representative career
Daylight was also selected as a Scotland international and played at the 2000 Rugby League World Cup.

References

External links
The Teams: Scotland
Statistics at rugbyleagueproject.org

1974 births
Living people
Adelaide Rams players
Australian people of Scottish descent
Australian rugby league players
Cronulla-Sutherland Sharks players
Gateshead Thunder (1999) players
Rugby league players from Sydney
Rugby league wingers
Scotland national rugby league team players
Western Reds players